Johnny Ng Kit-chong,  is a Hong Kong engineer and politician, who has been a member of the Legislative Council for the Election Committee constituency, which was newly created under the electoral overhaul imposed by Beijing.

On 5 January 2022, Carrie Lam announced new warnings and restrictions against social gathering due to potential COVID-19 outbreaks. One day later, it was discovered that Ng attended a birthday party hosted by Witman Hung Wai-man, with 222 guests. At least one guest tested positive with COVID-19, causing many guests to be quarantined.

In October 2022, Ng was tested positive for COVID-19.

Companies 
According to Ng's January 2022 declaration of assets, he owns shares in about 40 different companies.

Electoral history

References 

Living people
HK LegCo Members 2022–2025
Members of the Election Committee of Hong Kong, 2021–2026
Hong Kong pro-Beijing politicians
1974 births